Iris Sylvia Evans   (born December 31, 1941) is a former Member of the Legislative Assembly of Alberta and Minister of International and Intergovernmental Relations for the Canadian province. From November 25, 2004 to December 15, 2006 she served as Alberta's Minister of Health and Wellness in Premier Ralph Klein's cabinet.  After Ed Stelmach assumed the office of Premier, she was named Minister of Employment, Immigration and Industry in  his cabinet. After the 2008 Alberta provincial election, Premier Stelmach appointed Evans as Minister of Finance and Enterprise.  She was moved over to Intergovernmental Relations in January 2010.

A nurse by training, Evans was first elected to the legislature in 1997, representing the riding of Sherwood Park for the Progressive Conservatives.  She previously held the portfolios of Minister of Municipal Affairs and Minister of Children's Services.  Prior to being elected to the legislature, Evans served as a school board trustee, municipal councillor, and finally as the reeve of Strathcona County.

Parenting controversy
Evans sparked a controversy when speaking  to the Economic Club of Canada in Toronto on June 17, 2009, when she answered a question by stating that good parenting means sacrificing income to stay at home while children are young, and that her own children, now grown with young children of their own, "understood perfectly well that when you're raising children, you don't both go off to work and leave them for somebody else to raise."

In response to accusations that she had insulted working women, she later stated that she had not meant to "harm anybody or slam anybody's views on how they chose to parent or what choices they've made on the involvement in their families and parenting," suggesting that this demonstrated society's concern over parenting, and "So maybe its time for this debate ... maybe frequently we should examine what our choices are as families and see whether our choices are the ones that are working best for the child."

References 

1941 births
Living people
Canadian Lutherans
Canadian nurses
Canadian women nurses
Women government ministers of Canada
Finance ministers of Alberta
Health ministers of Alberta
Members of the Executive Council of Alberta
People from Sherwood Park
Politicians from Calgary
Progressive Conservative Association of Alberta MLAs
Female finance ministers
Women MLAs in Alberta
21st-century Canadian politicians
21st-century Canadian women politicians